Gongqingcheng railway station is a railway station located in Gongqingcheng, Jiujiang, in Jiangxi province, eastern China. It serves the Beijing–Kowloon railway and Nanchang–Jiujiang intercity railway. The station is accessed by Jiuxian Avenue and close to the G70 Highway.

Railway stations in Jiangxi
Jiujiang
Stations on the Beijing–Kowloon Railway